The Wujing Zongyao, sometimes rendered in English as the Complete Essentials for the Military Classics, is a Chinese military compendium written from around 1040 to 1044.

The book was compiled during the Northern Song dynasty by Zeng Gongliang (曾公亮), Ding Du (丁度) and Yang Weide (楊惟德), whose writing influenced many later Chinese military writers. The compendium was published under the auspices of Emperor Renzong of Song, who also authored the book's preface.  The book covers a wide range of subjects, including everything from naval warships to different types of catapults. It contains the earliest known written chemical formulas for gunpowder, made from saltpeter, sulphur and charcoal along with many added ingredients.  In addition to formulas for gunpowder, the compendium also contains details on various other gunpowder weapons such as fire arrows, incendiary bombs and projectiles, and grenades and smoke bombs.  It also describes an early form of the compass (using thermoremanence), and has the oldest illustration of a Chinese Greek fire flamethrower with a double-action dual-piston cylinder-pump capable of shooting a continuous blast of flame.

History

The Wujing Zongyao was compiled under the sponsorship of Emperor Renzong of Song (r. 1022–1063 AD), who was concerned that many officials were unfamiliar with the military classics, and partially as a response to the Song dynasty's war with the Tanguts of Western Xia.

A team of scholars worked from 1040 to 1044 to compile the Wujing Zongyao with the intent to collect all known military knowledge and to disseminate it to a wider government audience. Its chief editor, Zeng Gongliang, was assisted by the astronomer Yang Weide and the scholar Ding Du. After five years, the book was published with a preface authored by Emperor Renzong himself. Lorge remarks that Zeng Gongliang, the chief editor, was a government official rather than a military general, implying that the Wujing Zongyao was likely written for other government officials.

Parts of the Wujing Zongyao were copied from older sources; historian Ralph D. Sawyer calls it "essentially a cut-and-paste job", containing many passages from earlier classical military writings whose original authors are left unidentified, a common practice at the time. During the Song dynasty, the Wujing Zongyao was appended to two other books: the Xingjun xuzhi and the Baizhan qifa, both written by anonymous authors.

The Wujing Zongyao was one of 347 military treatises listed in the biographical chapters of the History of Song (1345 AD), one of the Twenty-Four Histories. Of these 347 different military treatises from the Song period, only the Wujing Zongyao, the Huqianjing (Tiger Seal Manual) of Xu Dong in 1004 AD, and fragments of similar works found in the later Yonglo Datian, have survived. The original text of the Wujing Zongyao was kept in the Imperial Library while a number of hand-written copies were distributed elsewhere, including a copy given to Wang Shao by Emperor Shenzong of Song in 1069 AD.

The original copy of the Wujing Zongyao was lost during the Jin–Song wars when the invading Jurchens sacked the Northern Song capital of Kaifeng in 1126 AD. Only a few manuscripts survived as a result of its secretive nature. Very few trustees of the government were ever allowed to read it as increased propagation would have increased the chance of it falling into enemy hands. A remaining copy of the Wujing Zongyao was remade into a newly published edition in 1231 AD in the Southern Song dynasty. During the Ming Dynasty (1368–1644 AD), another book was published in 1439 AD featuring fragments of the Wujing Zongyao of 1231 while omitting some material and combining it with two other books, including a preface by Li Jin. The entire Wujing Zongyao was reprinted in 1510 AD and this version is currently the oldest extant copy available. However, the historian Joseph Needham asserts that the 1510 AD edition is the most reliable in its faithfulness to the original version, since it was printed from blocks that were re-carved directly from tracings of the edition made in 1231 AD, rather than recombining fragments of the original with other material.

After the Wujing Zongyao of 1510 was printed, other Ming copies were made. This included the Jiajing edition (1522–1566 AD), the Wanli edition (1573–1619 AD) of Quanzhou, and the Wanli edition (1573–1619) of Jinling by Tang Xinyün (preserved by Cunjingge). During the Qing Dynasty (1644–1911 AD) it was also reprinted in two different editions during the 18th century, and again in 1934 with the Shanghai edition.

The Xu Wujing Zongyao (續武經總要; literally "Continuation of Wujing Zongyao") is a "continuation" of the Wujing Zongyao written in the late Ming dynasty. The book focuses primarily on army formations and military deployments. It was written by Fan Jingwen (1587–1644), who was then the Vice President of the Board of War (兵部尚書; bingbu shangshu). Fan wrote the book because he felt that reprints of the Wujing Zongyao circulating at that time were out of date and did not take into account the technological and strategic changes that had occurred since the Song dynasty. The only surviving copy of the Xu Wujing Zongyao is held by Fudan University Library.

Compass and navigation

In the 3rd century, the Chinese engineer Ma Jun invented the south-pointing chariot. This was a wheeled vehicle that employed differential gearing in order to lock a figurine of an immortal in place on the end of a long wooden staff, the figure having its arm stretched out and always pointing to the southern cardinal direction. Although the authors of the Wujing Zongyao were mistaken in believing that the design of the south-pointing chariot was not handed down (as it was reinvented during the Song period and combined with an odometer), they described a new device which allowed one to navigate. This was the 'south pointing fish' (a thermoremanence compass), essentially a heated iron (or preferably steel) object cut in the shape of a fish and suspended in a bowl of water. The Wujing Zongyao part 1 volume 15 text stated:

Later on in the Song dynasty the compass was used with maritime navigation. Several decades after the Wujing Zongyao was written, the scientist and statesman Shen Kuo (1031–1095 AD) wrote of the first truly magnetized compass needle in his book Dream Pool Essays (1088 AD). With a more efficient compass magnetized by lodestone, the thermoremanence compass fell out of use. The later maritime author Zhu Yu wrote of the magnetic needle compass as a means to navigate at sea in his Pingzhou Table Talks of 1119 AD.

Naval technology

The Wujing Zongyaos illustrated descriptions of warships had a significant influence on later naval handbooks and encyclopedias such as the naval section of the Wubei Zhi from circa 1628. These works would incorporate illustrations of ships originally from the Wujing Zongyao. The use of pictures from the Wujing Zongyao would continue to appear in Japanese naval texts up until the 18th century. The illustrations were used by both Nishikawa Joken's Ka-i Tsūshō-kō (Studies on the Intercourse and Trade with Chinese and Barbarians) in 1708 and Kanazawa Kanemitsu's Wakan Senyōshū (Collected Studies on the Ships used by the Chinese and Japanese) in 1766.

The Wujing Zongyao divides Chinese warships into six categories: Tower ships (lou chuan), combat or war junks (dou xian or zhan xian), covered swoopers (meng chong), flying barques (zou ge), patrol boats (you ting), and sea hawk ships (hai hu). The Wujing Zongyao'''s typology for classifying Chinese warships would reappear in later naval texts for many centuries.

Gunpowder

Gunpowder weapons
The Wujing Zongyao records detailed descriptions of gunpowder weapons such as incendiary projectiles, smoke bombs, fire arrows, and grenades. It documents incendiary projectiles containing low-nitrate gunpowder, which were launched from catapults or lowered down from city walls onto besiegers. Examples of these incendiaries include the "swallow-tail" incendiary (yanweiju) and the flying incendiary (feiju). The swallow-tail incendiary was made of straw tied together and dipped in fat or oil. Chinese soldiers defending a city under siege would light the incendiary and lower it onto any wooden structure of the invading army to engulf it in fire. The flying incendiary visually resembled the swallow-tail incendiary, but was lowered using an iron chain from a swape lever installed within the walls of the city. The book also describes an 'igniter ball' used in warfare and for finding the firing range. The Wujing Zongyao stated the following:

Gunpowder was attached to fire arrows and utilized as an incendiary. The Wujing Zongyao records that fire arrows were launched from bows or crossbows. The gunpowder used for fire arrows was likely a low-nitrate powder, and the quantity of gunpowder varied according to the type of bow. In the book, the force of gunpowder is said to be enough to launch an arrow, but only when the elasticity of the crossbow is sufficient.

The Wujing Zongyao discusses various types of incendiary bombs and grenades. They used a low-nitrate gunpowder that, while not powerful enough to cause an explosion, was effective for incendiary weapons. The huoqiu (literally "fire ball") was filled with gunpowder and launched using a trebuchet. Upon impact, the huoqiu would start a fire among an invading army. Chinese bombs such as the thunder clap bomb or pili pao used a greater percentage of gunpowder than that of the huoqiu. The gunpowder mixture for a bomb was placed within a rigid container that held in the expanding gas, allowing for more powerful explosions. The thunder clap bomb was constructed with a container made from bamboo.

In the Wujing Zongyao and other military texts, the distinction between a bomb and a grenade is ambiguous. At the time, the Chinese usually did not categorize gunpowder weapons according to their delivery method. One of the few exceptions is the shoupao, or hand bomb, which is analogous to the hand grenade.

Formulas

Gunpowder had already been invented prior to the Wujing Zongyao by Chinese alchemists in the 9th century. Early references to gunpowder can be found in the Daoist book Zhenyuan miaodao yaolue, written circa 850, and gunpowder was utilized in Chinese warfare as early as the 10th century in fire arrows and gunpowder fuses used to light the Chinese two-piston flamethrower.

However it was not until the Wujing Zongyao that the exact chemical formulas for early Chinese gunpowder was revealed. The Wujing Zongyao contains three formulas for gunpowder: one for an explosive bomb launched from a trebuchet, another for a similar bomb with hooks attached so that it could latch on to any wooden structure and set it on fire, and another formula specified for a poison-smoke bomb used for chemical warfare.

The Wujing Zongyaos first recorded gunpowder formula used in these bombs held a potassium nitrate level of 55.4% to 55.5%, sulfur content of 19.4% to 26.5%, and carbonaceous content of 23% to 25.2%. The first step for making gunpowder is to powder and mix together sulphur, saltpetre, charcoal, pitch, and dried lacquer. Tung oil, dried plants, and wax are mixed next to create a paste. The paste and powder are combined and carefully stirred. Then the mixture is placed inside a paper container, wrapped up, and tied using hemp twine. Several precautions are taken to prevent the gunpowder from becoming damp.

For the second formula, the inner ball alone had a nitrate percentage of 61.5% to 50.2%, a sulfur content of 30.8% to 25.1%, and if all carbonaceous matter was taken, 24.7%, if just taking the charcoal content alone, the carbon level was 7.7%. If the outer coating and inner ball are both included with the second black-powder formula, that would yield a nitrate level of 34.7% to 54.8%, a sulfur content of 17.4% to 27.4%, and if all carbonaceous material is used, 47.9% carbon, if only charcoal is used, 17.8%. If the inner ball of the third black-powder formula is only considered, it held nitrate levels of 39.6% if all carbonaceous matter was taken, 49.4% nitrate if excluding the poisons, and 60% if charcoal is specified alone. The sulfur content was 19.8% if all carbonaceous matter was considered, 24.7% if this excluded poisons, and 30% if charcoal is specified alone. The carbon content was 40.5% if all carbonaceous matter was considered, 25.9% if this excluded poisons, and 10% if charcoal alone was specified. If both the inner ball and outer coating are considered for the third formula, that would yield a nitrate level of 27% if all carbonaceous matter was taken, 31.2% if this excluded poisons, and 51.7% if charcoal alone was used. The sulfur content would be 13.5% if all carbonaceous matter was taken, 15.6% if this excluded the poisons, and 25.9% if only charcoal alone was specified.  The carbon content was 59.5% if all carbonaceous matter was taken into account, 53.2% if this excluded poisons, and 22.4% if charcoal alone was specified.

The first black-powder concoction was simply labeled as the "method for making the fire-chemical", with its ingredients and measured weight (in ounces) of each ingredient listed in the section below with the others listed in similar fashion.

Fireball formula

 Sulfur (14 oz.)
 Wo huang ('nest yellow', perhaps nodular sulfur) (7 oz.)
 Saltpetre (40 oz.)
 Hemp roots (1 oz.)
 Dried lacquer (1 oz.)
 Arsenic (1 oz.)
 White lead (lead carbonate) (1 oz.)

 Bamboo roots (1 oz.)
 Minium (lead tetroxide) (1 oz.)
 Yellow wax (0.5 oz.)
 Clear oil (0.1 oz.)
 Tung oil (0.5 oz.)
 Pine resin (14 oz.)
 Thick oil (0.1 oz.)

Total weight = 82.2 oz.

Caltrop fireball formula

Inner ball
 Sulphur (20 oz.)
 Saltpetre (40 oz.)
 Coarse charcoal powder (5 oz.)
 Pitch (2.5 oz.)
 Dried lacquer (pounded to powder) (2.5 oz.)
 Bamboo roots (1.1 oz.)
 Hemp roots, cut into shreds (1.1 oz.)
 Tung oil (2.5 oz.)
 Lesser oil (possibly an edible oil) (2.5 oz.)
 Wax (2.5 oz.)
Total weight of inner ball = 79.7 oz.

Outer coating
 Paper (12.5 oz.)
 Hemp (fibre) (10 oz.)
 Minium (1.1 oz)
 Charcoal powder (8 oz.)
 Pitch (2.5 oz)
 Yellow wax (2.5 oz)
Total weight of outer coating = 36.6 oz.

Total weight = 116.3 oz.

Poisonous smoke ball formula

Inner ball
 Sulphur (15 oz.)
 Saltpetre (30 oz.)
 Aconite (aconitum fischeri) (5 oz.)
 Croton oil (croton tiglium) (5 oz.)
 Wolfsbane (aconitum ferox or lycoctonum) (5 oz.)
 Tung oil (5 oz.)
 Lesser oil (2.5 oz.)
 Charcoal powder (5 oz.)
 Pitch (5 oz.)
 Arsenic (2 oz.)
 Yellow wax (1 oz.)
 Bamboo roots (1.1 oz.)
 Hemp roots (1.1 oz.)
Total weight of inner ball = 77.7 oz.

Outer coating
 Old paper (12.5 oz.)
 Hemp (stalk) skin fibre (10 oz.)
 Pitch (2.5 oz.)
 Yellow wax (2.5 oz.)
 Minium (1.1 oz.)
 Charcoal (8 oz.)
Total weight of outer coating = 36.6 oz.

Total weight = 114.3 oz.

Double-acting piston flamethrower

The Wujing Zongyao describes a flamethrower with a double-acting two-piston cylinder-pump capable of shooting a continuous blast of flame. The first Chinese battle to use the double-piston pump flamethrower was the Battle of Langshan Jiang in 919 AD. In the Battle of Langshan Jiang (Wolf Mountain River, 狼山江), the naval fleet of the Wenmu King of Wuyue defeated the fleet of the Kingdom of Wu because he had used 'fire oil' (huo yóu, 火油) to burn his fleet; this signified the first Chinese use of gunpowder in warfare, since a slow-burning match fuse was required to ignite the flames. Greek fire is likely based on distilled petroleum and is a weapon of Byzantine origin. The Chinese author Lin Yu explained in his book of 919 AD that Greek fire was acquired from their Arab maritime trade contacts in the Indian Ocean. Furthermore, the Chinese had been using the piston syringe since the Han Dynasty (202 BC – 220 AD). However, it was the later Wujing Zongyao that would provide the first illustrated drawing and greater textual explanation for how this flamethrower operated. In describing the drawn illustration of the flamethrower in the book, the Wujing Zongyao'' states:

Then the text goes on to provide further instructions about equipment, maintenance, and repair of flamethrowers:

Illustrations from the Wujing Zongyao

See also

 History of the Song dynasty
 Gunpowder warfare
 Technology of the Song dynasty
 Jiao Yu
 Battle of Tangdao
 Battle of Caishi
 Huolongjing, mid-14th-century Chinese military treatise.
 Jixiao Xinshu, Chinese military manual written during the 1560s and 1580s.
 Wubei Zhi, Chinese military book was compiled in 1621.

Notes

References

Further reading

External links
 

11th-century Chinese books
Chinese manuscripts
Chinese military texts
Military history of the Song dynasty
Military science
Military strategy books
Song dynasty literature